Harold Isherwood may refer to:
 Harry Isherwood, English footballer
Harold Isherwood (bishop) (1907–1989), Anglican bishop